Wind power became a significant energy source within South Australia over the first two decades of the 21st century. In 2015, there was an installed capacity of 1,475 MW, which accounted for 34% of electricity production in the state. This accounted for 35% of Australia's installed wind power capacity. In 2021, there was an installed capacity of 2052.95 MW, which accounted for 42.1% of the electricity production in the state in 2020.

The development of wind power capacity in South Australia has been encouraged by a number of factors. These include the Australian Government's Renewable Energy Target, which require electricity retailers to source a proportion of energy from renewable sources, incentives from the South Australian Government including a supportive regulatory regime and a payroll tax rebate scheme for large scale renewable energy developments. Also the state's proximity to the Roaring forties means there are high quality wind resources for wind farms to exploit. In mid-2009, RenewablesSA was established by the South Australian Government to encourage further investment in renewable energy in the state.

The load factor (or capacity factor) for South Australian wind farms is usually in the range of 32-38%. This means that a wind farm could typically produce between 32 and 38% of its nameplate capacity averaged over a year.

Wind farm overview

In 2003 the only large wind turbine in South Australia was a 0.15 MW unit at Coober Pedy and by early 2004 there was 34 MW of installed wind power capacity.

As of December 2010, South Australia had thirteen operational wind farms, with an installed capacity of 1,018 MW. By August 2014 this has increased to 1,473 MW, accounting for 27 per cent of electricity production. As of late 2015 there are a large range of new wind farms in various stages of planning but only one under construction, the Hornsdale Wind Farm. Hornsdale is a place that was generating 86 MW immediately prior to the 2016 South Australian blackout in September 2016.

South Australia has provided regulatory certainty for wind farms, and the government has implemented land use planning policies which represent national best practice for accommodating wind farms. On 2 June 2009, Premier Mike Rann announced plans to increase South Australia's renewable energy production target to 33% by 2020, well above the national target of 20% by 2020.

Operational wind farms

Snowtown Wind Farm (369 MW)
It is located on the Barunga Range of hills west of Snowtown in the mid-North of South Australia and around 150 km north of the state capital, Adelaide. The first stage of the Snowtown wind farm with a capacity of 98.7 MW was completed in 2008. The 270 MW second stage was completed in November 2014.

Hallett Wind Farm (350 MW)
 Hallett Wind Farm was developed in four stages: Hallett 1 (also known as Brown Hill Wind Farm), Hallett 2 (Hallett Hill), Hallett 4 (North Brown Hill) and Hallett 5 (Bluff Range). The proposed Hallett 3 (Mt Bryan) wind farm was put on hold by AGL in 2012.

Hallett 1 consists of 45 Suzlon 2.1 MW S88 turbines (95 MW in total) and was completed in June 2008. Hallett 2 consists of 34 2.1 MW Suzlon turbines (71.4 MW in total) and was completed in late 2009. Hallett 4 has 63 turbines with a total installed capacity of 132 MW, and was in full operation in early 2011. Hallett 5 consists of 25 Suzlon turbines each of 2.1 MW and was completed in early 2012.

Hornsdale Wind Farm (315 MW)
Hornsdale Wind Farm was built in three stages. Construction of Stage 1 began in September 2015 and was finished in September 2017. Stage 1 consists of 32 turbines each having a rated capacity of 3.2 MW (total 102.4 MW). Construction of Stage 2 began in July 2016 and was finished in June 2017. Stage 2 consists of 32 turbines each having a rated capacity of 3.2 MW (total 102.4 MW). Construction of Stage 3 began in April 2017 and was finished in December 2017. Stage 3 consists of 35 turbines each having a rated capacity of 3.2 MW (total 112 MW).

Lake Bonney Wind Farm (278.5 MW)
Lake Bonney Wind Farm was built in three stages. Stage 1 consists of 46 turbines each having a rated capacity of 1.75 MW (total 80.5 MW) and was finished in March 2005. Construction of Stage 2 began in November 2006 and was finished around April 2008. Stage 2 consists of 53 turbines of 3 MW (total 159 MW). Stage 3 consists of 13 turbines of 3 MW (total 39 MW). The combined capacity of the three stages are 278.5 MW making it the biggest wind farm in Australia at the time of completion.

Lincoln Gap (212 MW)
Lincoln Gap Wind Farm is built on the hills above Lincoln Gap, a gap in the range where the Eyre Highway and Whyalla railway line pass through.

Waterloo Wind Farm (131 MW)
The Waterloo Wind Farm was built as a 111 MW wind farm which was completed in 2010 at an estimated cost of $300 million. It had thirty-seven Vestas V90 3 MW turbines along the 18 km wind farm site connected through a 33 kilovolt (kV) internal reticulation network to the wind farm substation. The wind farm is approximately 30 kilometres south-east of the township of Clare and 100 km north of Adelaide. A Stage 2 expansion was approved to add up to an additional 6 turbines to the existing farm and increase its total generating capacity to over 130 MW.

Willogoleche Wind Farm (119 MW)
Willogoleche Wind Farm is in the Mid North of South Australia, just west of the town of Hallett.

Wattle Point Wind Farm (91 MW)
Wattle Point Wind Farm is near Edithburgh on the Yorke Peninsula. When it was officially opened in June 2005 it was Australia's largest wind farm at 91 MW. The installation consists of 55 wind turbines and was built at a cost of 165 million Australian dollars.

Mount Millar Wind Farm (70 MW)
Mount Millar Wind Farm is situated on an escarpment between the towns of Cowell and Cleve located 100 kilometres southwest of Whyalla. The 35 wind turbines are positioned on the elongated Mount Millar site (about 7 kilometres in length) to maximise wind exposure and can generate up to 70 megawatts of electricity. Construction of this wind farm started in late 2004 and was completed in December 2005. Power production started in February 2006.

Cathedral Rocks Wind Farm (66 MW)
Cathedral Rocks Wind Farm is in a remote coastal area located near the southern tip of the Eyre Peninsula in South Australia, about 30 km south west of Port Lincoln. It has 33 wind turbines capable of generating 66 MW in total. Construction started in 2004, and the first turbines were commissions in late 2005. The wind farm was fully operational by 2007.

Clements Gap Wind Farm (56 MW)

In February 2010, Pacific Hydro opened the 56.7 MW Clements Gap Wind Farm. The wind farm is located in South Australia's mid-north. The project has 27 x 2.1 MW Suzlon wind turbines, which generate enough electricity for 30,000 homes.

Canunda Wind Farm (46 MW)
Canunda Wind Farm is a $92.5 million, 46 MW wind power project located on grazing land approximately 16 kilometres south of Millicent. The wind farm is made up of 23 Vestas 2.0 MW wind turbines. The project was opened in March 2005.

Starfish Hill Wind Farm (33 MW)
Starfish Hill Wind Farm is near Cape Jervis on the Fleurieu Peninsula. It comprises 22 turbines of 1.5 MW each, with turbines on Starfish Hill on the nearby Salt Creek Hill, giving a combined generating capacity of 33 MW. Starfish Hill Wind Farm was commissioned in September 2003, making it the first major wind farm in South Australia.

Wind farm proposals 

In addition to its operating wind farms, South Australia has several proposals for new farms at various stages of development. These include:

Cancelled wind farm proposals

Myponga Wind Farm
The Myponga Wind Farm was a wind farm proposal by TrustPower in the southern Mount Lofty Ranges, on the Fleurieu Peninsula 50 km south of Adelaide, between the towns of Myponga and Sellicks Beach. Development approval was granted in 2003, and the project was planned to be operational by the end of 2010. The approval was revoked in 2011.

In 2009, TrustPower announced that it would not proceed with the project, because the South Australian government had not approved variations to height, layout and turbine type in the existing planning approval. The requested change was to reduce the number of turbines to 16 but increase their power output and increase the height of the turbines from 100 metres to 110 metres. The planning approval was eventually revoked.

Keyneton
Pacific Hydro proposed to build a 105 MW wind farm near Keyneton east of the Barossa Valley. It was approved by the government in 2013. The proposal was cancelled in October 2019.

Impacts

The increasing proportion of renewable energy in the state has caused a significant decrease in the emissions intensity of electricity generation in South Australia.

The rapid development of wind power in South Australia has led to direct economic effects from the construction and operation of wind farms. There has been a total of $2.8 billion in wind power investment up to October 2011 which is estimated to have created 3,000 direct and indirect jobs. Studies into the economic effects of wind farms have reported that a 50 MW installation pays host landholders some $250,000 per year, is constructed by workers who spend up to $1.2 million locally and contributes up to $80,000 annually to community projects.

Policies to streamline the approval process for wind farm developments have met with some community opposition. Specific concerns have been raised by rural residents who claim that wind farms have an unacceptable impact on property values, health and the environment.

There has been some controversy with respect to the impact of the rising share of wind power and other renewables such as solar on retail electricity prices in South Australia. A 2012 report by The Energy Users Association of Australia claimed that retail electricity prices in South Australia were then the third highest in the developed world behind Germany and Denmark, with prices likely to rise to become the most expensive in the near future. The then South Australian Opposition Leader, Isobel Redmond, linked the state's high retail prices for electricity to the Government's policy of promoting development of renewable energy, noting that Germany and Denmark had followed similar policies. On the other hand, it has been noted that the impact of wind power on the merit order effect, where relatively low cost wind power is purchased by retailers before higher cost sources of power, has been credited for a decline in the wholesale electricity price in South Australia. Data compiled by the Australian Energy Market Operator (AEMO) shows South Australian wholesale electricity prices are the third highest out of Australia's five mainland states, with the 2013 South Australian Electricity Report noting that increases in prices were "largely driven by transmission and distribution network price increases".

The South Australian Government has stated that the price increase due to the Australian Government's carbon price (in place from July 2012 to June 2014) was approximately half of that experienced by other states due to the high installed capacity of wind and gas-fired generation.

2011 Renewable Energy Plan

In October 2011 the South Australian state Government released a renewable energy plan proposing a range of measures including:
 a revised renewable energy target of 33% of the state's electricity production coming from renewable sources by 2020
 a ban on new coal-fired power stations
 greater involvement of local government in the development approval process to promote more effective community engagement
 investigations into increasing the capacity of transmission lines to support renewable energy developments including wind energy
 no wind farms allowed within one kilometre of any home unless agreement is reached between the developer and the home owner.

See also

List of active power stations in South Australia
List of onshore wind farms
List of wind farms in Australia
List of wind farms in South Australia
Energy in South Australia
Renewable energy in Australia
Wind power in Australia

References

 
Wind power in Australia
Renewable energy commercialization